Muhambal (also spelled Mhambal or Mahambel) is a town in northwestern Syria, administratively part of the Ariha District of the Idlib Governorate. According to the Syria Central Bureau of Statistics, Muhambal had a population of 4,970 in the 2004 census. It is the administrative center of the Muhambal Subdistrict, which contained 21 localities with a collective population of 27,089 in 2004. Nearby localities include Jisr al-Shughur, Bishlamun and Bizit to the west, Juzif to the south, al-Rami to the east, and Ayn Shib to the north.

References

Populated places in Ariha District